I Can See Your House from Here is the seventh studio album by English progressive rock band Camel. Released in 1979, a new line up was introduced with founding members Andrew Latimer (guitar) and Andy Ward (drums) joined by bassist Colin Bass (to replace Richard Sinclair) and keyboardists Jan Schelhaas (who joined in 1978 for the Breathless tour) and Kit Watkins (ex-Happy The Man) who replaced Dave Sinclair. At one point, the album was going to be called Endangered Species.

Recording 
Work started on the album in summer 1979, collaborating with producer Rupert Hine, at the Farmyard Studios in Little Chalfont. The process also took place in an Elizabethan country house, a residential recording studio that suited the band well. The orchestral overdubs were added at London's AIR Studios. Mel Collins (who also worked with Caravan) contributed to the band's sound on the saxophone, while Phil Collins was chosen to play percussion. Andy Latimer was pleased with the end product, saying Hine "was great fun to work with, he was really up and zappy. I enjoyed making that record. We did it rather quickly and it wasn't a lengthy production."

The album was released in October 1979. It spent three weeks in the chart in late October and early November, reaching No. 45. An accompanying single was planned, but shelved. Instead a maxi single containing an edited version of Andy Latimer and Kit Watkins "Remote Romance" was backed with "Rainbow's End" from Breathless (1978) and a Camel / Mick Glossop production of "Tell Me", first released on Rain Dances (1977). It did not reach the charts. The single "Your Love is Stranger than Mine" / "Neon Magic" followed in February 1980.

Cover artwork 
The cover image is based on a joke that was somewhat popular at the time, in which Jesus, while hanging up on the Cross dying, calls out for his disciple Peter to come to him, who does so with great difficulty. The punchline is that Jesus merely wants to tell Peter, "I can see your house from here."

Tour
The world tour began on 8 October at The Dome, Brighton, England, following France, Germany, Sweden, Norway, Belgium, Spain, Portugal and ended on 29 January 1980 in Koseinenkin Hall of Tokyo, Japan.

Track listing 
All credits adapted from the original releases.
Side one
"Wait" (Andrew Latimer, John McBurnie) – 5:02
 Andrew Latimer – guitar, backing vocals
 Kit Watkins – Yamaha electric grand and Rhodes electric pianos, Hammond C3 organ, Solina and Moog synthesizers
 Jan Schelhaas – Yamaha electric grand piano, Yamaha CS-80, Prophet-5 and Moog synthesizers
 Colin Bass – bass, lead vocals
 Andy Ward – drums
"Your Love Is Stranger Than Mine" (Colin Bass, Latimer, Jan Schelhaas, Andy Ward) – 3:26
 Andrew Latimer – guitar, backing vocals
 Kit Watkins – Prophet-5 synthesizer
 Jan Schelhaas – Yamaha electric grand piano, Minimoog
 Colin Bass – bass, lead vocals
 Andy Ward – drums
 Mel Collins – alto saxophone
"Eye of the Storm" (Kit Watkins) – 3:52 – this was an updated version of a track that Watkins had played with his previous band Happy the Man
 Andrew Latimer – guitar
 Kit Watkins – Hohner Clavinet, flute, Solina and Moog synthesizers
 Colin Bass – fretless Wal bass
 Andy Ward – drums, massed marching military snares
"Who We Are" (Latimer) – 7:52
 Andrew Latimer – guitar, lead vocals, flute, autoharp
 Kit Watkins – Solina and Moog synthesizers
 Jan Schelhaas – grand piano
 Colin Bass – bass, backing vocals
 Andy Ward – drums
 Simon Jeffes – orchestral arrangements

Side two
"Survival" (Latimer) – 1:12
 Simon Jeffes – orchestral arrangements
 Gavin Wright – leader of the orchestra
"Hymn to Her" (Latimer, Schelhaas) – 5:37
 Andrew Latimer – guitar, lead vocals, flute, autoharp
 Kit Watkins – Hohner Clavinet, Hammond C3 organ, Solina and Moog synthesizers
 Jan Schelhaas – grand piano
 Colin Bass – bass, backing vocals
 Andy Ward – drums
"Neon Magic" (Latimer, Vivienne McAuliffe, Schelhaas) – 4:39
 Andrew Latimer – guitar, lead vocals
 Kit Watkins – Hammond C3 organ, Yamaha CS-80 and Solina synthesizers
 Jan Schelhaas – Yamaha electric grand piano, Solina, Yamaha CS-80 and Moog synthesizers
 Colin Bass – bass
 Andy Ward – drums
"Remote Romance" (Latimer, Watkins) – 4:07
 Andrew Latimer – guitar
 Kit Watkins – Hohner Clavinet, Yamaha CS-80 and Moog synthesizers, EMS sequencer
 Jan Schelhaas – EMS sequencer
 Andy Ward – drums, percussion, loops
"Ice" (Latimer) – 10:17
 Andrew Latimer – guitar
 Kit Watkins – Yamaha electric grand and Rhodes electric pianos, Hammond C3 organ, Solina and Moog synthesizers
 Jan Schelhaas – grand piano
 Colin Bass – bass
 Andy Ward – drums

2009 Expanded & Remastered Edition
 "Remote Romance" (Single version)
"Ice" (Live 1981) – 7:15

Personnel 
Camel
 Andrew Latimer – guitars, flute, backing vocals; autoharp on "Who We Are"; lead vocals on "Who We Are", "Hymn to Her" and "Neon Magic"
 Colin Bass – bass, backing vocals; lead vocals on "Wait" and "Your Love Is Stranger Than Mine"
 Kit Watkins – Hammond C3 organ, Solina synthesizer, Yamaha electric grand piano, Rhodes electric piano, Moog synthesizer, Minimoog, Hohner Clavinet, Prophet-5, Yamaha CS-80, EMS Sequencer, flute
 Jan Schelhaas – Yamaha CS-80, Yamaha electric grand piano, grand piano, Prophet-5, Moog synthesizer, Minimoog, EMS Sequencer
 Andy Ward – drums, percussion

Additional musicians
 Mel Collins – alto saxophone on "Your Love Is Stranger Than Mine"
 Phil Collins – percussion
 Rupert Hine – backing vocals
 Simon Jeffes – orchestral arrangements on "Who We Are" and "Survival"

Charts

References

External links
 Camel - I Can See Your House from Here (1979) album review by Matthew Plichta, credits & releases at AllMusic.com
 
 Camel - I Can See Your House from Here (1979) album review by Shachar Sagui, credits & user reviews at SputnikMusic.com
 Camel - I Can See Your House from Here (1979) album to be listened as stream at Play.Spotify.com

1979 albums
Camel (band) albums
Decca Records albums
Albums produced by Rupert Hine